Geoffrey 'Geppie' Piers Henry Dutton AO (2 August 192217 September 1998) was an Australian author and historian.

Biography
Dutton was born into a prominent pastoralist family of Anlaby Station near Kapunda, South Australia in 1922. His grandfather was Henry Dutton, the "Squire of Anlaby"; his parents were adventurer Henry Hampden Dutton and talented socialite Emily Dutton. For his relationship to these and other people prominent in the history of South Australia see Dutton family of South Australia.

Geoffrey grew up in four houses owned by his parents: Anlaby Station near Kapunda; Kalymna (or Kalimna) House, on the edge of the east parklands, Adelaide; Ooraminna, on the foreshore at Victor Harbor; and Rocky Point, a limestone house overlooking Eastern Cove, Kangaroo Island. He was taught French as a young boy.

At age eight, Geoffrey was sent to Wykeham Preparatory School near Belair, Adelaide. A year later, in 1931, his mother, Emily, sent him to Geelong Grammar School, Victoria. 

He studied at the University of Adelaide, where he wrote for the student newspaper On Dit and avant-garde magazine Angry Penguins. He later studied at Magdalen College, Oxford. During his career, Dutton wrote or edited over 200 books, including poetry, fiction, biographies, art appreciation, art and literary history, travel books, novels for children and critical essays.

In 1965, together with Max Harris and Brian Stonier, he co-founded the Australian paperback publishing company Sun Books. In June 1968, Dutton was appointed as an inaugural member of the Australian Council for the Arts.

He was appointed an Officer of the Order of Australia in 1976, and died in 1998.

Awards and nominations
 Grace Leven Prize for Poetry, 1958: winner for Antipodes in Shoes
 FAW Christopher Brennan Award, 1993: winner

Bibliography

Novels
 The Mortal and the Marble (Chapman & Hall, 1950)  
 Andy (Collins, 1968) 
 Tamara (Collins, 1970)  
 Queen Emma of the South Seas (Macmillan, 1976)  
 The Eye Opener (University of Queensland Press, 1982) 
 Flying Low: A Novel (1992)

Short stories
 The Españo

Poetry
 Night Flight and Sunrise (Reed & Harris, 1944)
 Antipodes in Shoes (Edwards & Shaw, 1958)
 Flowers and Fury: Poems (F. W. Cheshire, 1962)
 On My Island: Poems (F. W. Cheshire, 1967)
 Poems Soft and Loud (F. W. Cheshire, 1967)
 Findings and Keepings: Selected Poems, 1939-1969 (Australian Letters, 1970)
 North West: Fifteen Poems from the Pilbara and Kimberley (The author, 1971?)
 New Poems to 1972 (Australian Letters, 1972)
 A Body of Words (Edwards & Shaw, 1977)
 Selective Affinities: New Poems (Angus & Robertson, 1985)
 New and Selected Poems (Angus & Robertson, 1993)
 New York Nowhere (Lytlewode Press, 1998)

Children's
 Tisi and the Yabby (Collins, 1965)
 Seal Bay (Collins, 1966)
 Tisi and the Pageant (Rigby, 1968)
 The Prowler (Collins, 1982)

Non-fiction
 A Long Way South (Chapman & Hall, 1953)
 Founder of a City: The Life of Colonel William Light, First Surveyor-General of the Colony of South Australia: Founder of Adelaide 1786-1839 (F. W. Cheshire, 1960)
 Patrick White (Lansdowne Press, 1961)
 Australia and the Monarchy (Sun Books, 1966)
 Edward John Eyre: The Hero as Murderer, Collins/F. W. Cheshire, Sydney (1967); reprint, Penguin Books, Melbourne (1977)
 In Search of Edward John Eyre (Macmillan, 1982)
 Snow on the Saltbush: The Australian Literary Experience (Viking, 1984)
 The Squatters (Currey O'Neil, 1985) The author's life at Anlaby Station
 Sun, Sea, Surf and Sand : The Myth of the Beach (Oxford University Press, 1985)
 The Innovators: The Sydney Alternatives in the Rise of Modern Art, Literature and Ideas (Macmillan, 1986)
 Kenneth Slessor: A Biography (Viking, 1991)
 Out in the Open: An Autobiography (University of Queensland Press, 1994)
 A Rare Bird: Penguin Books in Australia 1946-96 (Penguin Books, 1996)

Edited
 Australia's Censorship Crisis (Sun Books, 1970) - with Max Harris
 Australian Verse from 1805 : A Continuum (Rigby, 1976)
 Republican Australia? (Sun Books, 1977) 
 Seven Cities of Australia (J. Ferguson, 1978)
 Sir Henry, Bjelke, Don Baby and Friends (Sun Books, 1971) - with Max Harris
 The Vital Decade: Ten Years of Australian Art and Letters (Sun Books, 1968) - with Max Harris
 The Australian Bedside Book: A Selection of Writings from The Australian Literary Supplement (Macmillan, 1987) - preface by Morris West; contributors include Elizabeth Jolley, Dianne Highbridge, Les A. Murray, Tim Winton, Kate Grenville.

References
 The Wakefield Companion to South Australian History
 The Oxford Companion to Australian Literature
 Who's Who in Australia 1999

References

External links
 Obituary: Geoffrey Dutton
 Brief biography

Australian biographers
Male biographers
Australian travel writers
Australian art historians
Australian literary critics
Australian art critics
Australian children's writers
Australian essayists
Male essayists
Officers of the Order of Australia
1922 births
1998 deaths
20th-century Australian poets
Australian male poets
20th-century biographers
People from Kapunda
Writers from South Australia
20th-century essayists
20th-century Australian male writers